is a Japan-based CGI animation studio dedicated to making full-length feature films and video game cutscenes. Their extensive résumé includes CGI add-ins for television series and video games.

The company was formed through Sega spinning off its CGI division, and is best known for making the cutscenes for the Sonic the Hedgehog games, beginning with 2006's Sonic the Hedgehog. It is currently subsidized under TMS Entertainment, Sega's flagship anime subsidiary. Marza Animation Planet is also known for being one of the production companies for the film Sonic the Hedgehog (2020) and its sequel.

Films 
{| class="wikitable" style="width: 75%"
|-
! Year
! Title
! Director
! Production
! Distributor
|- 
| style="text-align:center;" | 2013
| Space Pirate Captain Harlock
| Shinji Aramaki
| Toei Animation
| Toei Company
|- 
| style="text-align:center;" | 2016
| Kingsglaive: Final Fantasy XV
| Takeshi Nozue
| Visual Works
| Aniplex
|-
| style="text-align:center;" | 2017
| Resident Evil: Vendetta| Takanori Tsujimoto
| Stage 6 FilmsKadokawaCapcom
| Kadokawa (Japan)Sony Pictures Entertainment
|-
| style="text-align:center;" | 2019
| Lupin III: The First| Takashi Yamazaki
| TMS Entertainment
| Toho
|-
| style="text-align:center;" | 2020
| Sonic the Hedgehog|rowspan="3" | Jeff Fowler
|rowspan="3" | Original FilmBlur StudioSega
| rowspan="3" | Paramount Pictures
|-
| style="text-align:center;" | 2022
| Sonic the Hedgehog 2|-
| style="text-align:center;" | 2024
| Sonic the Hedgehog 3|-
|}

 Short films 
 Samurai Frog Golf (2022)
 The Peak (2019) (Created using Unity) 
 Sonic: Night of the Werehog (2008)
 Sonic Drone Home (2022)
 The Gift (2016) (Created using Unity)
 Robodog (discontinued project)

 Video game cutscenes 
 Virtua Fighter 5 (2006)
 Sonic the Hedgehog (2006)
 Sonic Riders (2006)
 Oshare Majo: Love and Berry (2007)
 Phantasy Star Portable (2007)
 Nights: Journey of Dreams (2007) 
 Sonic Riders: Zero Gravity (2008)
 Samba de Amigo (2008) 
 Sonic Unleashed (2008) 
 Phantasy Star Portable 2 (2009)  
 Hatsune Miku: Project DIVA (2009) 
 Resonance of Fate (2010)
 Super Monkey Ball: Step & Roll (2010) 
 Hatsune Miku: Project DIVA 2nd (2010)
 Sengoku Taisen (2010) 
 Sonic Colors (2010)
 Sonic Free Riders (2010) 
 Virtua Tennis 4 (2011)
 Sonic Generations (2011)  
 Super Monkey Ball: Banana Splitz (2012)
 Phantasy Star Online 2 (2012)
 Hatsune Miku: Project DIVA F (2012)
 Kingdom Conquest II (2013)
 Phantasy Star Online 2 2nd OP (2012)
 Demon Tribe (2013)
 Sonic & All-Stars Racing Transformed (2012)
 Phantasy Star Online 2 3rd OP (2012)
 Sonic Lost World (2013)
 The World of Three Kingdoms (2013)
 Hatsune Miku: Project DIVA F 2nd (2014)
 Phantasy Star Nova (2014)
 Yakuza 0 (2015)
 Hatsune Miku: Project DIVA X (2016)
 VR Zone Shinjuku - Winged Bicycle (2017)
 Resident Evil Vandetta: Z Infected Experience (2017)
 Sonic Forces (2017)
 Team Sonic Racing (2019)
 Sonic Frontiers (2022)

 Other 
 Hatsune Miku Live Party 2012 (MIKUPA♪) (2012) (Stage Event)
 Hatsune Miku Magical Mirai 2013 (2013) (Stage Event)
 Mario Kart 8 (2014 (original), 2017 (Deluxe)) (3-D models for artwork illustration)
 Splatoon (2015) (3-D models for artwork illustration)
 Happy Forest (2015) (Tech Demo Trailer created using Unreal Engine 4)
 Hatsune Miku Expo 2016 (2016) (Stage Event)
 Ultimate Bowl (2015 (v1), 2017 (v2)) (Tech Demo Trailer created using Unreal Engine 4 (v1) and Unity (v2))
 Splatoon 2 (2017) (3-D models for artwork illustration)
 The Last Guardian (2016) (Animations)
 Ninjala (2020) (Animations)
 Earwig and the Witch (2020) (Production partner)Oni: Thunder God’s Tale'' (2022) (Animation)

References

External links 

 
 Marza Animation Planet's Linkedin Page
 

Mass media companies established in 2003
Japanese animation studios
Japanese film studios
Mass media companies based in Tokyo
Sega Sammy Holdings
Sega divisions and subsidiaries